The Arthur Kill station is a station on the Staten Island Railway (SIR). The station opened on January 21, 2017, replacing the Atlantic and Nassau stations, which were the two stations in the poorest condition along the line at the time. It is located on Arthur Kill Road near Lion Street and Barnard Avenue, in the Tottenville neighborhood of Staten Island, New York. It has two tracks and two side platforms, and is ADA-accessible via ramps.

Station layout
This station has two tracks and two side platforms, with an overpass connecting the platforms.  As opposed to the Nassau and Atlantic stations, which this station replaces, both platforms can accommodate  trains. Those stations only had single-door boarding. There are benches and surveillance cameras on both platforms and windscreens, which are covered by canopies. The total cost of the station was $27.6 million. An art instillation, titled Tottenville Sun, Tottenville Sky and created by Jenna Lucente, was installed in the windscreens as part of the station construction. Consisting of 28 laminated glass panels, it depicts the landscape and wildlife of the adjacent community.

The station is ADA-accessible via two ramps, one on each side of the overpass. It includes a 150-car parking lot, on SIR property, which can be expanded in the future.

History

The construction of an Arthur Kill station was first proposed in the 1990s to replace the Atlantic and Nassau stations, which were located directly to the north and south of the station, respectively. Commuters from these stations were only allowed access from the last cars of the trains. As a result, these two stations were not included in station modernization programs with other stations. The construction of the station had been deferred due to budget constraints, but funding for it was included in the 2010–2014 MTA Capital Program, with $16 million allocated to the project.

The station was expected to be complete by 2010, but was delayed due to a lack of funding in the capital program. A groundbreaking ceremony was held on October 18, 2013, with a projected opening date of late 2015. In July 2015, the opening date was then pushed back to August 2016, with delays caused in part by the addition of storm resiliency measures. In June 2016, the station's opening was pushed back once again to November due to changes in the Electric Distribution Room. In October 2016, the opening date was pushed back yet again to January 2017 because of a need to redesign the electrical distribution room, the exterior wall panel, and various communications issues. The station opened on January 21, 2017, at 5:00 a.m, replacing the adjacent former stations at Nassau and Atlantic, which were permanently closed on the same day.

References

External links

 Staten Island Railway station list
 Staten Island Railway general information
Platforms from Google Maps Street View
Stairs and ramp to overpass from Google Maps Street View
Overpass from Google Maps Street View
 View from Arthur Kill Road from Google Maps Street View
 View from Ellis Street from Google Maps Street View

Staten Island Railway stations
Railway stations in the United States opened in 2017
2017 establishments in New York City
Transportation projects in New York City